Ratasjärv is a lake in Rõuge Parish, Võru County, Estonia.

See also
List of lakes of Estonia

External links
 Ratasjärv at Eestigiid.ee
 

Lakes of Estonia
Rõuge Parish
Lakes of Võru County